Betty Thatcher Oros (born Elizabeth Anna Thatcher, April 18, 1917, Elyria, OhioAugust 19, 2001) was an American automobile designer.

Education
Betty Thatcher Oros graduated from Elyria High School in 1935. She attended the Cleveland School of Arts, today’s Cleveland Institute of Art. She majored in Industrial Design, graduating with honors.

Work at Hudson

Hudson Motor Company was among the first automotive companies to employ women designers full-time. They wanted a woman to contribute a female point of view to automotive design, hired Oros as the first female American automotive designer in 1939.

Oros designed the 1939 Hudson Big Boy truck that was based on the Hudson Commodore sedan, but "turned it into a beautifully streamlined pickup." Her contributions to the 1941 Hudson included exterior trim with side lighting, interior instrument panel, interiors, and interior trim fabrics.

Resignation
Oros designed for Hudson Motor Co. from 1939 into 1941, when she and Joe Oros were married. As Joe Oros was working in the Cadillac Studio at GM, Betty resigned from Hudson to avoid a conflict of interest.  

The Oroses had five children, Joe III, Christina, Janet, Mary, and John. She later served on the Santa Barbara Museum Board and Symphony League Board. Betty Thatcher Oros died on August 19, 2001.

References

 
 

Hudson Motor Car Company
American automobile designers
1917 births
2001 deaths
Cleveland School of Art alumni